Ike Dixon (1896 – 1953) was an American musician and club owner. He was a major figure in the Baltimore jazz scene, as proprietor of the Comedy Club in that city, a major music venue that first opened in 1934 and was an after-show gathering place for many national figures who performed elsewhere in Baltimore.

Background
Dixon, who played the drums, piano and soprano saxophone, was the founder of a traveling jazz band, created in 1920. According to Duke Ellington's autobiography Music is My Mistress, Dixon had the best band in Baltimore. After retiring in 1934, he opened The Comedy Club in the former Savoy Ballroom, located at 1440 Pennsylvania Avenue. It became an important jazz venue, where many touring musicians gathered to party after their shows. In 1939, Dixon opened the Comedy Club Hotel, with 10 rooms above the club. Those whom the club hosted include Billie Holiday, Sammy Davis Jr., Dinah Washington, Miles Davis. Jackie "Moms" Mabley, Edward "Slappy" White, and Redd Foxx.

After his death in 1953, the club was taken over and run until it closed in the 1960s by his sons, Howard and Isaiah Dixon (1923–2013), the latter of whom served in the Maryland House of Delegates.

References

1896 births
1953 deaths
Businesspeople from Baltimore
People from Baltimore
People from Maryland
20th-century American businesspeople